Sepehr Heydari (born 19 June 1980 in Esfahan, Iran) is a retired Iranian football defender. He has a  bachelor of Mechanical engineering from Najaf Abad Azad University.

Club career
He started to show his talent in Zob Ahan and finally moved to Persepolis. The 2007/08 season was his first season at Persepolis and head coach Afshin Ghotbi believed in him so much that Heidari played in all matches except one for which he received a suspension. He scored the most important goal of his career in the 96th minute against Sepahan on the final day of the season which won the league for Persepolis after six years.
During the 2008/09 season he was once again put in the starting line up by Afshin Ghotbi but when Ghotbi resigned and Peyrovani took over, Heidari was replaced and played as substitute for some time before being put back in the starting eleven for the AFC Champions League by new coach Nelo Vingada. He extended his contract with Persepolis for two more years in July 2009. He continued as being one of the regular players for 2009–10 season and had a good scoring stats for the season. He became captain of Persepolis in January 2011. He won the Hazfi Cup in 2011 with Persepolis but after the managerial changes the new coach Hamid Estili announced that he does not need Sepehr and he may leave the club. He joined Mes Kerman on 6 July 2011.

Club career statistics

 Assist Goals

International career
He shows some good performances but has not  got a spot in the first eleven. He was invited to Team Melli by Afshin Ghotbi in January 2010 and played against Mali.

Personal life
His father Siavash was striker of Zob Ahan in Takht Jamshid Cup.

Honours

Iran's Premier Football League
Winner: 1
2007/08 with Persepolis
Runner up: 1
2004/05 with Zob Ahan
Hazfi Cup
Winner: 3
2002/03 with Zob Ahan
2009/10 with Persepolis
2010/11 with Persepolis

References

External links

Iranian footballers
Iran international footballers
Association football defenders
Persian Gulf Pro League players
Zob Ahan Esfahan F.C. players
Persepolis F.C. players
Sanat Mes Kerman F.C. players
Sportspeople from Isfahan
1980 births
Living people
Islamic Azad University alumni